Scurria ceciliana is a species of sea snail, a true limpet, a marine gastropod mollusk in the family Lottiidae, one of the families of true limpets.

Subspecies
 Scurria ceciliana ceciliana (d'Orbigny, 1841)
 Scurria ceciliana magellanica (Strebel, 1907)

Description

Distribution

References

Lottiidae
Gastropods described in 1841